"I Love You" is a song written by B. Grimes, performed by Ginny Wright and Jim Reeves, and released on the Fabor label (catalog no. 101). In January 1954, it peaked at No. 3 on the Billboard country and western juke box chart and spent a total of 22 weeks on the charts. It was also ranked No. 27 on Billboards 1954 year-end country and western retail sales chart.

See also
 Billboard Top Country & Western Records of 1954

References

American country music songs
1954 songs
Jim Reeves songs